The A 14 road is an A-Grade trunk road in Sri Lanka. It connects the Medawachchiya with Talaimannar.

The A 14 passes through Mankulam, Cheddikulam, Paraiyanalankulam, Madu Road, Murunkan, Uyilankulam, Mannar and Pesalai to reach Talaimannar.

References

Highways in Sri Lanka
Transport in Mannar District
Transport in Vavuniya District